North Central High School is a public high school in Indianapolis, Indiana, United States.  It is part of the Metropolitan School District of Washington Township. North Central is an International Baccalaureate (IB) school.

History
North Central was established in 1956 in response to Washington Township's rapidly growing population and the desire of residents to have a local high school.  Prior to this, students from the township attended Broad Ripple High School and Shortridge High School in Indianapolis.  (At this time, most of the township was outside the city limits.) In 1963 the current facility was opened, and the original building was repurposed to Northview Middle School.

Demographics
For the 2015-2016 school year, enrollment was 3,636 students. 41% were black, 35% were white, 14% were Hispanic, 6% were multiracial, and 4% were Asian. 42% qualified for free lunches and 6% of the student body qualified for reduced-price lunches.

For the 2020-21 school year, enrollment was 3,754 students. Of these, 38% were black, 33% were white, 19% were Hispanic, 6% were multiracial, and 4% were Asian. 45% of students qualified for free lunches and 2% qualified for reduced-price lunches.

Music
The North Central Wind Ensemble has been named the ISSMA State Concert Band Champions six times (2004, 2006, 2007, 2009, 2010, and 2011).

The North Central High School Symphony Orchestra has been named the ISSMA State Concert Orchestra Champions ten times (1985, 1989, 1990, 1991, 1992, 1994, 2006, 2007, 2009, and 2014).

The North Central Counterpoints show choir have been named the ISSMA State Concert Choir Grand Champions fifteen times (1990, 1991, 1992, 1994, 2000, 2001, 2002, 2003, 2004, 2005, 2006, 2007, 2008, 2009, 2011) and the State Show Choir Grand Champions eleven times (2005, 2006, 2009, 2010, 2011, 2012, 2013, 2015, 2016, 2018, 2019).

Notable alumni

 Adam Alexander, NASCAR Camping World Series broadcaster, SpeedTV contributor, anchor
 Todd Brewster, journalist and author
 Cheryl Bridges, former marathon world record holder and first woman to obtain an athletic scholarship at a U.S. university
 Sean Buck, Navy Vice Admiral, 63rd Superintendent of the United States Naval Academy
 A'Lelia Bundles, author and journalist
 Priyanka Chopra, Indian actress, singer, film producer
 Mitch Daniels, Governor of Indiana (2005–13), President of Purdue University (2013–)
 Andrew East, American football player
 Kenneth "Babyface" Edmonds, musician, multi- platinum selling producer, with over 100 top 10 hits for various artists
 Jared Fogle, spokesperson and convicted felon
 Ray Gaddis, retired soccer player for the Philadelphia Union in Major League Soccer.
 Jason Gardner, 1999 Indiana Mr. Basketball, Final Four participant at The University of Arizona. Current director of player relations at Arizona. He briefly returned to North Central for the 2020-21 season to serve as the boys basketball head coach. 
 Eric Gordon, Indiana Mr. Basketball, 2007, former Indiana University PG. 2008 NBA Draft: 1st round, 7th pick to Los Angeles Clippers.
 Amber Harris, pro basketball player for Chicago Sky, 2-time WNBA champion
 Marie Collins Johns, former President & CEO, Verizon, mayoral candidate for Washington, D.C.
 Ro James, musician
 Ronnie Johnson, basketball player
 Scott A. Jones, co-founder of Boston Technologies and ChaCha
 Peter Kassig, aid worker, taken hostage and ultimately executed by The Islamic State.
 Ron Klain, White House Chief of Staff to President Joe Biden, former Chief of Staff to former Vice President Al Gore, and was Chief of Staff to Biden when he was Vice President
 Jon Krahulik, Justice of the Indiana Supreme Court.
 Brad Leaf, American-Israeli basketball player for Hapoel Galil Elyon and Maccabi Tel Aviv of the Israel Premier League 
 Todd Lickliter, former Butler University and Iowa Hawkeyes head men's basketball coach
 David Logan, basketball player for Dinamo Basket Sassari
 Mary Mackey, novelist and poet
 Maicel Malone-Wallace, 1996 Olympic Gold Medalist 4x400 Relay
 Derrick Mayes football wide receiver at Notre Dame and the Green Bay Packers
 Diana Mercer, author and Huffington Post columnist
 Susan Neville, Professor of English at Butler University and Flannery O'Connor Award Winning author.
 Bart Peterson, politician, former Mayor of Indianapolis
 Courtney Roby, NFL football player, also played football at Indiana University
 Chad Spann, NFL football player 
 Marc Summers, television personality, Double Dare game show Nickelodeon, currently Unwrapped, Food Network
Lars Tate, Gatorade National High School football player of the year, University of Georgia and NFL starter
 Don Thompson, executive at McDonald's Corporation
 Troy Van Voorhis, MIT chemistry professor and speaker at The Veritas Forum
Kris Wilkes, 2017 Indiana Mr. Basketball and former college basketball player for UCLA
 David Wolf, astronaut
John Von Ohlen, jazz drummer who played in the bands of Woody Herman and Stan Kenton
 Tim Rogers, journalist and video game developer

See also
 List of high schools in Indiana

References

Educational institutions established in 1956
Public high schools in Indiana
Schools in Indianapolis
1956 establishments in Indiana